Marchioni is an Italian surname. Notable people with the surname include:

Ambrogio Marchioni (1911–1995), Italian archbishop and Vatican diplomat
Elisabetta Marchioni (or Marchionni; XVIII century), Venetian painter
Julián Marchioni (born 1993), Argentine footballer
Nicolò Marchioni (or Melchioni; 1662–1752), Italian violin maker based in Bologna
Paul Marchioni (born 1955), French footballer
Vinicio Marchioni (born 1975), Italian actor

See also
Marchione
Marchionne

Italian-language surnames